Kishibe (written: 岸部 or 岸辺) is a Japanese surname. Notable people with the surname include:

, Japanese actor and musician
, Japanese guitarist
, Japanese musicologist
, Japanese actor

Fictional characters
, a character from Jojo's Bizarre Adventure Diamond Is Unbreakable
, a character from Chainsaw Man Chainsaw Man

See also
Kishibe Station, a railway station in Suita, Osaka Prefecture, Japan

Japanese-language surnames